Solovey iz sela Marshyntsi (Соловейко з Буковини) is a 1966 short film. It was the first studio filmed movie starring Sofia Rotaru.

Rotaru was 19 when she starred in the film as a performer of Ukrainian and Moldavian folk songs. The setting is the premises of the Chernivsti Philharmonic Society. The name of the film was ultimately adopted as Rotaru's nickname in Soviet Union media reports of her career in the 1970s.

The singer appears in the titles with her Ukrainified (first version) last name - Rotar' (Rotaru in Moldavian).

External links
 Софiя Ротару: Новая Черемшина (Ukrainian)

Ukrainian-language films
1966 films
Concert films
Soviet-era Ukrainian films
Soviet short films
1966 in the Soviet Union
N
Films about entertainers
Ukrainian black-and-white films
Soviet black-and-white films
1960s dance films
1966 short films